Dishayen is an Indian television series produced by Time Magnetics and broadcast on DD National. The series premiered on 8 October 2001 and ended on 18 January 2005 .It was aired on  DD National at prime time Slot from 9.00PM to 9.30 PM on Monday and Tuesday every week

Series overview

Cast
 Purbi Joshi / Pooja Ghai as Neha & Nikita (twins)(Protagonist)
 Karan Oberoi as Rajeev Gupta (Protagonist)
 Sudhanshu Pandey as Sameer Gupta/Baba/Jagmohan sharma (Antagonist) (second parallel lead)
 Reena Kapoor as Sonia (Antagonist) (second parallel lead)
 Shagufta Ali as Vidya, Sonia's mother
 Narendra Jha as Veer Pratap Singh
 Rajeev Verma as Rajat Sharma
 Smita Hai as Savitri Rajat Sharma
 Vineeta Malik as Gayatri
 Jaya Mathur as Shalini
 Dharmesh Vyas as Deepak
 Lata Sabharwal as Reema

Plot
Neha and Nikita are twins. Nikita dreams about Bollywood stardom, Neha is the simpler one. Their father wants Nikita to marry Rajive. In desperation, Nikita tells her twin that she will commit suicide unless Neha pretends to be her and marry Rajive. After all, Nikita reasons, it is Neha who always wanted the quiet family life. On their wedding night, Neha admits to Rajive that she is not Nikita. Rajive knew about the substitution; he agreed because he wanted a wife like Neha. The sisters’ aunt learns about the switch and tells the bridegroom's mother Mrs. Gayatri. The angry mother-in-law makes Neha leave her house, but Neha slowly wins over her in-laws, except for her brother-in-law Sameer, the dark horse of the family.
A producer gets Nikita drunk and takes semi-nude photos of her so that he can blackmail her. Nikita tells Neha, and they decide to do something, but instead suffer an accident. Nikita survives, but Neha goes missing. Neha's in-laws think Nikita has died, and Nikita realizes that a way out of her problems is to impersonate Neha. Her plan works and she becomes well-adjusted to Neha's new family, except Sameer and the twins' cousin cause trouble for her, believing that she is Neha. Nikita slowly transforms to the dutiful wife Neha was and develops feelings for Rajive. It is revealed that Neha survived the accident. As her memories return, she heads back to her in-laws. She is kept unaware of the truth by Rajive and Nikita.
Ex-convict Vishal is also the love child of the twin's father, Sharma, and another woman. Vishal shows up one day to make his father pay for his sins. The twins' mother spurns Sharma, but the twins become accepting of their step-brother. Neha is distraught when she learns that Nikita is carrying Rajive's baby, because Neha too is pregnant from Rajive. Neha confronts Rajive and asks him to divorce Nikita.

Meanwhile, Vishal becomes enemies with Sameer. The hostility escalates, until Sameer learns about the twin's pregnancies. He is upset, as he realizes that he had a soft spot for Nikita. In a freak accident, Nikita loses her child. She sees that divorce from Rajive is imminent, which makes her doubly sad. Strangely, her abortion brings her parents together and they accept Vishal as their son. Sameer, whose ego is damaged beyond repair, mends fences with Vishal and turns himself in to police for investigation of his crimes. Neha, meanwhile learns that Rajive never served divorce papers to Nikita. She thinks that Rajive's fidelity is wavering. Rajive becomes upset because he is equally answerable to both the sisters. When Rajive fails to serve Nikita the divorce papers, Neha gets angry and threatens to divorce him. Sameer sides with Neha and they both leave the house, but both suffer a brutal accident. The families go to see them. Sameer dies after apologising for his misdeeds. When Nikita and Rajive go to see Neha, she has delivered twins. She hands the twins to Rajive and Nikita, then dies.

Main Cast

References

External links
 

Indian drama television series
2001 Indian television series debuts
2006 Indian television series endings
Television series about twins
DD National original programming